Don't Cry, Peter, also known as Nicht Weinen Peter, is a 1964 Slovene comedy war adventure film directed by France Štiglic. Released on 17 July 1964, the film was entered  in the Third International Film Festival of India (1965) in Delhi, India. The cast included Lojze Rozman, Bert Sotlar, Zlatko Šugman, Majda Potokar, Polde Bibič and Bogdan Lubej as the titular Peter.

The story, set during WW II, is about three Partisans entrusted the job of safely taking three children to a liberated area, meeting German soldiers on the way.

Plot
Dane and Lovro are two mine workers now turned soldiers, in the 2nd Sappers Company of a Partisan Brigade. They bemoan their lack of aggressive war combat as compared to the 1st Sappers. Finally, they are sent on an important mission. Their excitement turns to embarrassment when they realise that their job is to accompany three children and transport them safely to the liberated area. They are joined by a new recruit Dolfe. A bond develops between the soldiers and the children, especially with the youngest, four-year-old Peter whose curiosity causes many tense and dangerous situations, thus requiring a constant attention by Dane and Lovro. 
During their travel Peter unintentionally falls into a small cave which leads to a huge stockpile of German explosives and ammunition which is then blown up, causing massive material loss to the Germans.

Cast
 Lojze Rozman as Dane
 Bert Sotlar as Lovro
 Majda Potokar as Magda
 Zlatko Šugman as Dolfe
 Bogdan Lubej as Peter
 Andrej Kurent as Commander
 Polde Bibič as Matija
 Karel Pogorelec as Innkeeper
 Danilo Bezlaj as German soldier
 Franci Prus as German soldier
 Vinko Podgoršek as German soldier

References

External links 
 

Slovenian comedy films
1964 films
Films directed by France Štiglic
Slovene-language films
Yugoslav World War II films
Films about orphans
War films set in Partisan Yugoslavia